Chierchia is an Italian surname. Notable people with the surname include:

Gennaro Chierchia (born 1953), Italian linguist 
Luigi Chierchia (born 1957), Italian mathematician

Italian-language surnames